Asian Americans and Pacific Islands Americans have given fluctuating levels of support to conservative movements and political parties in the United States, particularly the Republican Party. Many Republican Party members with these origins have obtained posts as elected representatives and political appointments as office holders.

Voting trends
From the 1940s to the 1990s most Asian Americans were anti-communist refugees who had fled mainland China, North Korea or Vietnam, and were strongly anti–Communist. Many had ties to conservative organizations. In recent years, more liberal Asian–American groups such as newer Chinese and Indian immigrants have greatly changed the Asian–American political demographics, as well as a larger proportion of younger Asian Americans, many of whom have completed college degrees.

During the 1990s and 2000s, Asian American voting behavior shifted from moderate support for the Republican Party to stronger support for the Democratic Party. In the 1992 presidential election Republican George H. W. Bush received 55% of the Asian–American vote compared to 31% for Democrat Bill Clinton. Asian Americans voted Republican and were the only racial group more conservative than whites in the 1990s, according to surveys. By the 2004 election, Democrat John Kerry won 56% of the Asian American vote, with Chinese and Indian Americans tending to support Kerry, and Vietnamese and Filipino Americans tending to support George Bush. Japanese–Americans leaned towards Kerry, while Korean–Americans leaned towards Bush. Democrat Barack Obama won 62% of the Asian American vote in the 2008 presidential election, with the margin increasing during the 2012 presidential election, where Asian Americans voted to re-elect Obama by 73%. In the 2014 midterm elections, based on exit polls, 50% of Asian Americans voted Republican, while 49% voted Democrat; this swing towards voting for Republicans was a shift from the strong Democratic vote in 2012, and had not reached 50% since 1996. The 2016 National Asian American Survey, conducted before the 2016 presidential election, found that 55% of Asian American registered voters supported Democratic candidate Hillary Clinton and only 14% supported Republican candidate Donald Trump.

Despite their growing trend of voting for Democrats in national elections, Asian Americans have tended to identify as independents and have not developed strong ties to political parties as a group. Due to the smaller size of the groups population, in comparison to the population as a whole, it has been difficult to get an adequate sampling to forecast voter outcomes for Asian Americans. In 2008, polls indicated that 35% considered themselves non-partisan, 32% Democrats, 19% independents, and 14% Republicans. The 2012 National Asian American Survey found that 51% considered themselves non–partisan, 33% Democrats, 14% Republicans, and 2% Other; Hmong, Indian, and Korean Americans strongly identified as Democrats, and Filipino and Vietnamese Americans most strongly identified as Republicans. In 2013, according to the Asian American Legal Defense and Education Fund, Chinese Americans were the least likely Asian American ethnicity to have a party affiliation, with only one third belonging to a party. The 2016 National Asian American Survey found that 41% of Asian Americans identified as non-partisan, 41% as Democrats (a modest increase from 2008 and 2012), and 16% as Republicans.

Neither the Republican nor Democratic parties have financed significant efforts to the registration of Asian Americans, however much more attention has been focused on contributions from Asian Americans, having once been referred to as potential "Republican Jews". As recently as 2006, the outreach efforts of America's two major political parties have been unbalanced, with the Democratic Party devoting more resources in attracting Asian Americans. In 2016, a majority of Asian-Americans possessed the same political views on racial profiling, education, social security, and immigration reform as the Democratic Party; the efforts to attract Asian-Americans has produced a proportionally significant growth in Democratic affiliation by Asian-Americans from 2012 to 2016 by 12 percent. Political affiliation aside, Asian-Americans have trended to become more politically active as a whole, with 2008 seeing an increase of voter participation by 4% to a 49% voting rate. Such efforts by the Democratic Party in attracting Asian Americans came to an apex in 2020, with only Vietnamese Americans leaning mostly to the Republicans.

Timeline of events
 1900s
 1903 – Jonah Kūhiō Kalanianaʻole elected as delegate to the U.S. House of Representatives from Hawaii Territory's At–large district

 1920s
 1927 – Victor S. K. Houston elected as delegate to the U.S. House of Representatives from Hawaii Territory's At–large district

 1930s
 1935 – Samuel Wilder King elected as delegate to the U.S. House of Representatives from Hawaii Territory's At–large district

 1950s
 1953 – Samuel Wilder King elected as territorial governor of Hawaii
 1956 – President Dwight Eisenhower appoints Peter Tali Coleman as governor of American Samoa
 1959 – Hiram Fong elected a United States senator from Hawaii
 James Kealoha elected as lieutenant governor of Hawaii

 1960s
 1969 – President Richard Nixon appoints Carlos Camacho as governor of Guam

 1970s
 1971 – Kurt Moylan elected as lieutenant governor of Guam
 1977 – S. I. Hayakawa elected as United States Senator from California
 1978 – Peter Tali Coleman elected as governor of American Samoa
 Tufele Liamatua elected as lieutenant governor of American Samoa
 1979 – Paul McDonald Calvo elected as governor of Guam
 Joseph Franklin Ada elected as lieutenant governor of Guam
 1980s
 1981 – President Ronald Reagan appoints Wendy Lee Gramm as Head of the Commodity Futures Trading Commission
 1982 – Pedro Tenorio elected as governor of the Northern Mariana Islands
 Pedro Agulto Tenorio elected as lieutenant governor of the Northern Mariana Islands
 1983 – Joseph Franklin Ada elected as governor of Guam
 1985 – Vicente T. Blaz elected as Delegate to the U.S. House of Representatives from Guam's at–large district
 1987 – Pat Saiki (HI) elected to U.S. Congress
 Frank Blas elected as lieutenant governor of Guam
 1989 – President George H. W. Bush appoints Elaine Chao as United States Deputy secretary of Transportation
 Peter Tali Coleman elected as governor of American Samoa
 Galea'i Peni Poumele elected as lieutenant governor of American Samoa

 1990s
 1990 – Juan Babauta elected as resident representative of the Northern Mariana Islands
 Lorenzo I. De Leon Guerrero as governor of the Northern Mariana Islands
 Benjamin Manglona as lieutenant governor of the Northern Mariana Islands
 1991 – President George H. W. Bush appoints the following:
 Elaine Chao as director of the Peace Corps
 Pat Saiki as administrator of the Small Business Administration
 Jan C. Ting as assistant commissioner at the Immigration and Naturalization Service
 Cheryl Lau is elected as secretary of State of Nevada
 1992 – Gaioi Tufele Galeai appointed as lieutenant governor of American Samoa
 1993 – Jay Kim (CA) elected to U.S. Congress
 1995 – John Ensign (NV) elected to U.S. Congress
 Matt Fong elected as California State Treasurer
 1998 – President Bill Clinton appoints Bert Mizusawa as Deputy Undersecretary of the Army for Interagency and International Affairs
 Pedro Tenorio elected as governor of the Northern Mariana Islands
 Jesus Sablan elected as lieutenant governor of the Northern Mariana Islands

 2000s
 2001 – President George W. Bush appoints the following: 
 Elaine Chao as United States secretary of labor
 David S. C. Chu as under secretary of defense for personnel and readiness
 Viet D. Dinh as United States assistant attorney general for the Office of Legal Policy
 David Kuo as deputy director of the White House Office of Faith-Based and Neighborhood Partnerships
 Susan Ralston as special assistant to the president
 Victor Cha as director for Asian Affairs
 Karan Bhatia as deputy under secretary of Commerce for Industry
 John Quoc Duong as director of the White House Initiative on Asian Americans and Pacific Islanders
 Chiling Tong as deputy assistant secretary of the International Trade Administration
 John Ensign elected as United States senator from Nevada
 2002 – Duke Aiona as lieutenant governor of Hawaii
 Juan Babauta elected as governor of the Northern Mariana Islands
 Pedro Agulto Tenorio elected as Resident Representative of the Northern Mariana Islands
 Diego Benavente as lieutenant governor of the Northern Mariana Islands
 2003 – Felix Perez Camacho elected as governor of Guam
 Kaleo Moylan as lieutenant governor of Guam
 2005 – Bobby Jindal (LA) elected to U.S. Congress
 2006 – President George W. Bush appoints the following:
 Edmund C. Moy as director of the United States Mint
 Wan J. Kim as assistant United States attorney general for the Civil Rights Division
 John Yoo as deputy assistant U.S. attorney general in the Office of Legal Counsel
 Mina Nguyen as deputy assistant secretary for Business Affairs and Public Liaison
 Angela Perez Baraquio to the President's Council on Service and Civic Participation
 2007 – Michael Cruz elected as lieutenant governor of Guam
 2008 – Bobby Jindal elected as governor of Louisiana
 President George W. Bush appoints the following:
 Sada Cumber as United states special envoy to the Organisation of Islamic Cooperation
 Neel Kashkari as assistant secretary of the treasury for financial stability
 Sandy Baruah as acting administrator of the Small Business Administration
 Jessie K. Liu as deputy assistant attorney general
 Lanhee Chen to the Social Security Advisory Board
 James C. Ho appointed as solicitor general of Texas
 2009 – Steve Austria (OH) and Joseph Cao (LA) are elected to U.S. Congress

 2010s
 2010 – Charles Djou (HI) elected to U.S. Congress 
 2011 – Nikki Haley elected as governor of South Carolina
 Eddie Baza Calvo elected as governor of Guam
 2013 – Eloy Inos elevated as governor of the Northern Mariana Islands
 Jude Hofschneider elevated to lieutenant governor of the Northern Mariana Islands
 Sean Reyes appointed as attorney general of Utah
 2014 – Nandita Berry appointed as secretary of State of Texas
 2015 – Amata Coleman Radewagen elected as delegate to the U.S. House of Representatives from American Samoa's at–large district
 Ralph Torres elected as lieutenant governor of the Northern Mariana Islands
 Ralph Torres elevated as governor of the Northern Mariana Islands
 Victor Hocog elevated as lieutenant governor of the Northern Mariana Islands
 Yumi Hogan becomes the first lady of Maryland
 2017 – President Donald Trump appoints the following:
 Nikki Haley as United States ambassador to the United Nations
 Elaine Chao as United States secretary of Transportation
 Noel Francisco as solicitor general of the United States
 Seema Verma as administrator of the Centers for Medicare and Medicaid Services
 Ajit Pai as chairman of the Federal Communications Commission
 Neil Chatterjee as chairman of the Federal Energy Regulatory Commission
 Neomi Rao as administrator of the Office of Information and Regulatory Affairs
 Manisha Singh as assistant secretary of State for Economic and Business Affairs
 Gopal Khanna as director of the Agency for Healthcare Research and Quality
 Kari Bingen as principal deputy under secretary of defense for intelligence
 Derek Kan as under secretary of transportation for policy
 Vishal Amin as intellectual property enforcement coordinator
 Raj Shah as White House principal deputy press secretary
 Grace Koh as special assistant to the president (technology, telecom, and cyber–security policy)
 2018 – President Donald Trump appoints the following:
 Jeff Tien Han Pon as director of the United States Office of Personnel Management
 Michelle Giuda as assistant secretary of State for Public Affairs
 Holly Ham as executive director of the White House Initiative on Asian Americans and Pacific Islanders
 Brent K. Park as deputy administrator for Defense Nuclear Nonproliferation
 Joyce Y. Meyer as White House deputy director of legislative affairs (House Liaison)
 Uttam Dhillon as White House deputy counsel
 Kimberly Yee elected as state treasurer of Arizona

 2020s
 2020 – Young Kim and Michelle Steel elected to U.S. Congress

Politicians

Arizona
 Quang Nguyen – Arizona state representative (2021–present)
 Barry Wong – Arizona state representative (1993–2001) and Arizona corporation commissioner (2006–2007)

California
 Harry Sidhu – mayor of Anaheim (2018–2022)
 Tyler Diep – California State assemblyman (2018–2020)
 Steven Choi – California State assemblyman (2016–2023)
 Phillip Chen – California State assemblyman (2016–present)
 Vince Fong – California State assemblyman (2016–present)
 Tri Ta - California State assemblyman (2023-present)
 Andrew Do – Orange County supervisor (2014–present)
 Chris Cate – San Diego City Councilman (2014–present)
 Ling Ling Chang – California State assemblywoman (2014–2016) & California state senator (2018–2021)
 Lisa Bartlett – Orange County supervisor (2014–present)
 Tani Cantil–Sakauye – Chief Justice of the California Supreme Court (2011–present)
 Harmeet Dhillon – Vice Chairwoman of the California Republican Party (2010–2016)
 Janet Nguyen – Orange County Board supervisor (2007–2014), California state senator (2014–2018), & California State assemblywoman (2020–present)
 Mike Gin – mayor of Redondo Beach (2005–2013)
 Van Tran – California State assemblyman (2004–2010)
 Betty Tom Chu – mayor of Monterey Park, California (2003–2012)
 Alan Nakanishi – California State assemblyman (2002–2008)
 Jose Esteves – mayor of Milpitas (2002–2016)
 Debra Wong Yang - United States Attorney for the Central District of California (2002-2006)
 Shirley Horton – California State assemblywoman (2000–2008)
 Ming Chin – Associate Justice of the Supreme Court of California (1996–2020)
 Nao Takasugi – California State assemblyman (1992–1998)
 Eunice Sato – mayor of Long Beach (1980–1982)
 Tom Hom – California State assemblyman (1970–1972)

Colorado
 Janak Joshi – Colorado state representative (2011–2017)

Connecticut
 Kimberly Fiorello – Connecticut state representative (2021–present)
 Prasad Srinivasan – Connecticut state representative (2011–2019)
 Tony Hwang – Connecticut state representative (2009–2015) & Connecticut state senator (2015–present)

Georgia
 B. J. Pak – Georgia state representative (2011–2017) and United States attorney for the Northern District of Georgia (2017–2021)
 Soo Hong – Georgia State Representative (2023-present)

Hawaii
 Kurt Fevella – Hawaii state senator (2019–present)
 Val Okimoto – Hawaii state representative (2019–present)
 Kenji M. Price – United States attorney for the District of Hawaii (2018–2021)
 Andria Tupola – Hawaii state representative (2015–2019) & Honolulu City Councilor (2020–present)
 Feki Pouha – Hawaii state representative (2015–2017)
 Lauren Matsumoto – Hawaii state representative (2013–present)
 Beth Fukumoto – Hawaii state representative (2013–2017) (Became a Democrat in 2017)
 Richard Fale – Hawaii state representative (2013–2015)
 David S. Chang – chairman of the Hawaii Republican Party (2011–2014)
 Aaron Ling Johanson – Hawaii state representative (2010–2014) (Became a Democrat in 2014)
 Karen Awana – Hawaii state representative (2007) (Became a Democrat in 2007)
 Mike Gabbard – Hawaii state senator (2007) (Became a Democrat in 2007)
 Kymberly Pine – Hawaii state representative (2005–2013) & Honolulu City Councilor (2013–2017) (Became a Democrat in 2017)
 Lynn Finnegan – Hawaii state representative (2003–2011)
 Corinne Wei Lan Ching – Hawaii state representative (2003–2013)
 Kika Bukoski – Hawaii state representative (2001–2005)
 Guy P. Ontai – Hawaii state representative (2001–2005)
 Edward H. Kubo, Jr. – United States attorney for the District of Hawaii (2001–2009)
 Emily Auwae – Hawaii state representative (1999–2003)
 Bertha Leong – Hawaii state representative (1999–2005)
 David Pendleton – Hawaii state representative (1997–2005)
 Samson Aiona – Hawaii state representative (1997–1999)
 Quentin Kawananakoa – Hawaii state representative (1995–1999)
 Larry Tanimoto – mayor of Hawaii County (1990)
 Bernard Akana – mayor of Hawaii County (1988–1990)
 Stan Koki – Hawaii state senator (1988–1995)
 Patrick A. Ribellia – Hawaii state representative (1987) (Became a Democrat in 1987)
 Ann Kobayashi – Hawaii state senator (1981–1988) (Became a Democrat in 1988)
 Marvin Dang – Hawaii state representative (1981–1983)
 Kimo Wong – Hawaii state representative (1981–1983)
 Mike Liu – Hawaii state representative (1979–1991) & Hawaii state senator (1995–1997)
 Barbara Marumoto – Hawaii state representative (1979–2013)
 Tony Narvaes – Hawaii state representative (1977–1983)
 Donna Akeda – Hawaii state representative (1975–1987) & Hawaii state senator (1987–1988) (Became a Democrat in 1988)
 Kinau Kamalli – Hawaii state representative (1975–1987)
 Dan Hakoda – Hawaii state representative (1975–1977)
 Alvin T. Amaral – Hawaii state representative (1973–1977)
 Archie Hapai III – Hawaii state representative (1973–1975)
 Patrick A. Ribellia – Hawaii state representative (1971–1974) (Became a Democrat in 1974)
 Wing Kong Chong – Hawaii state representative (1971–1975)
 Hiram Fong – Hawaii state representative (1948–1959) & United States Senator (1959–1973)
 Hiram Fong Jr. – Hawaii state representative (1971–1979)
 James Aki – Hawaii state representative (1971–1976) (Became a Democrat in 1976)
 Howard K. Oda – Hawaii state representative (1967–1976) (Became a Democrat in 1976)
 Tennyson Lum – Hawaii state representative (1967–1971 & 1977–1979) & Hawaii state senator (1977–1987)
 Wilfred Soares – Hawaii state representative (1967–1977) & Hawaii state senator (1971–1975)
 Andy Poepoe – Hawaii state representative (1967–1977)
 Ralph Ajifu – Hawaii state representative (1967–1979) & Hawaii state senator (1979–1985)
 Peter Aduja – Hawaii state representative (1967–1975)
 Thomas k. Lalakea – Hawaii state representative (1965–1967)
 Clinton I. Shirashi – Hawaii state senator (1963–1967)
 Toshi Ansai – Hawaii state senator (1963–1971)
 Kenneth H. Nakamura – Hawaii state representative (1963–1965)
 Francis M. F. Ching – Hawaii state senator (1959–1965)
 Noburu Miyake – Hawaii state senator (1959–1967)
 Lawrence Kunihisa – Hawaii state senator (1959–1963)
 Bernard H. Tokunaga – Hawaii state senator (1959–1963)
 John T. Ushijima – Hawaii state senator (1959–1962) (Became a Democrat in 1962)
 Wadsworth Yee – Hawaii state representative (1959–1967) & Hawaii state senator (1967–1983)
 Robert K. Fukuda – Hawaii state representative (1959–1963)
 Katsugo Miho – Hawaii state representative (1959–1971)
 Percy Mirikitani – Hawaii state representative (1959–1967) & Hawaii state senator (1967–1975)
 Robert Teruya – Hawaii state representative (1959–1963)
 Sanji Abe – Hawaii state representative (1940–1946)

Idaho
 Julie Yamamoto – Idaho state representative (2020–present)
 Julie VanOrden – Idaho state representative (2012–2018)
 Pat Takasugi – Idaho state representative (2007–2011)

Kansas
 Shanti Gandhi – Kansas state representative (2013–2015)

Kentucky
 Amul Thapar – United States attorney for the Eastern District of Kentucky (2006–2008)

Massachusetts
 Sabita Singh – appeals court judge for the Commonwealth of Massachusetts (2017–present)
 Dean Tran – Massachusetts state senator (2017–2021)
 Keiko Orrall – Massachusetts state representative (2011–2019)
 Donald Wong – Massachusetts state representative (2011–present)

Minnesota
 Jennifer Carnahan – Chair of the Minnesota Republican Party (2017–2021)
 Rachel Paulose – U.S. attorney for the District of Minnesota (2006–2007)

Missouri
 Jonathan Patterson – Missouri state representative (2019–present)

Nebraska
 Tony Fulton – Nebraska state representative (2007–2013) & Nebraska State Tax Commissioner (2016–present)
 Lormong Lo – Omaha City Councillor (1993–2001)

Nevada
 Glen Leavitt – Nevada assemblyman (2018–present)
 Francis Allen–Palenske – Nevada assemblywoman (2004–2008)

New Hampshire
 Aboul Khan – New Hampshire state representative (2012–present)
 Saggy Tahir – New Hampshire state representative (2001–2011)

New Jersey
 Philip Kwon – Deputy Counsel for Port Authority of New York and New Jersey (2012–2018)
 David F. Bauman – New Jersey Superior Court Judge (2008–present)
 Kevin J. O'Toole – New Jersey state senator (2002–2017)

New York
 Peter Koo – New York City Councillor (2010–2012) (Became a Democrat in 2012)
 Lester Chang - New York State Assemblyman (2023-present)

Ohio
 Niraj Antani – Ohio state representative (2014–2021) & Ohio state senator (2021–present)
 Cliff Rosenberger – Ohio state representative (2011–2018)

Oklahoma
 Daniel Pae – Oklahoma state representative (2018–present)
 Ervin Yen – Oklahoma state senator (2014–2018)

Oregon
 John Lim – Oregon state senator (1993–2001) & Oregon state representative (2005–2009)

Pennsylvania
 David Oh – Philadelphia City Councillor (2012–present)
 Jeff Coleman – Pennsylvania state representative (2001–2005)
 John Pippy – Pennsylvania state representative (1997–2003) & Pennsylvania state senator (2003–2012)

Rhode Island
 Allan Fung – mayor of Cranston (2009–2021); Republican nominee for governor of Rhode Island in 2014 and 2018.

Tennessee
 Jerome Cochran – Tennessee state representative (2002–2006)
 Sabi Kumar - Tennessee state representative (2015–present)

Texas
 Jacey Jetton – Texas state representative (2021–present)
 Steve Le – Houston City Councillor (2015–present)
 Richard Nguyen – Houston City Councillor (2013–2015)
 Angie Chen Button – Texas state representative (2009–present)
 Al Hoang – Houston City Councillor (2009–2013)
 M.J. Khan – Houston City Councillor (2003–2009)
 Martha Wong – Texas state representative (2003–2007) & Houston City Councillor (1993–2003)
 Bala K. Srinivas – mayor of Hollywood Park (1988–1994)

Utah
 Sophia M. DiCaro – Utah state representative (2015–2017)
 Brian Shiozawa – Utah state senator (2013–2017)
 Dean Sanpei – Utah state representative (2010–2017)
 Curtis Oda – Utah state representative (2005–2017)

Virginia
 Ron Villanueva – Virginia State Delegate (2010–2018)

Washington
 Conrad Lee – mayor of Bellevue (2012–2018)

Washington, D.C.
 Viet D. Dinh – Assistant attorney general of the United States (2001–2003)
 Jessie K. Liu – United States attorney for the District of Columbia (2017–2020)

West Virginia
 Tom Takubo – West Virginia state senator (2015–present)

Wyoming
 Nimi McConigley – Wyoming state representative (1994–1996)

Academics, policy specialists, and commentators
 A.D. Amar
 Reihan Salam
 Dinesh D’Souza
 Husain Haqqani
 Miles Yu
 Raj Shah
 Hsiao-ting Lin
 Raghuram Rajan
 Ramesh Ponnuru
 Ajit Pai
 Sadanand Dhume
 John Yoo
 Tunku Varadarajan
 Vivek Ramaswamy
 Anna Chennault

References

Further reading

 
Conservatism-related lists
Conservatism in the United States